Neuron navigator 1 is a protein that in humans is encoded by the NAV1 gene.

This gene belongs to the neuron navigator family and is expressed predominantly in the nervous system. The encoded protein contains coiled-coil domains and a conserved AAA domain characteristic for ATPases associated with a variety of cellular activities. This gene is similar to unc-53, a Caenorhabditis elegans gene involved in axon guidance. The exact function of this gene is not known.

References

Further reading

Human proteins